"Planet Caravan" is a song by the English heavy metal band Black Sabbath. It was originally released on their 1970 album Paranoid.

Overview 
Black Sabbath's Geezer Butler – who composed the song's lyrics – said the song is about floating through the universe with one's lover. Black Sabbath lead vocalist Ozzy Osbourne uses a Leslie speaker to achieve the vocals' treble and vibration effects. The piano parts on the track were played by album engineer Tom Allom. Iommi overdubbed flute to the reversed multitrack master which was then re-forwarded and treated with stereo delay.

On 31 May 2020, "Planet Caravan" was used as wake-up music for the crew of a SpaceX Crew Dragon before the craft's launch later that day. It was the first time music was used to wake astronauts since the last shuttle mission in July 2011. The craft was bound for the International Space Station.

The song features an ambient and laid back sound which is often considered a departure from the band’s traditional brand of heavy metal.

Personnel 
 Ozzy Osbourne – vocals
 Tony Iommi – guitar, flute
 Geezer Butler – bass guitar
 Bill Ward – congas
 Tom Allom – piano

Pantera cover 

"Planet Caravan" was covered by American heavy metal band Pantera for their 1994 album Far Beyond Driven.

Release and reception 
The song was released as the second single from the Far Beyond Driven album, and the follow-up single to their hit single "I'm Broken" in 1994 on East West Records as a 12" single. It became Pantera's highest-charting single, peaking on the UK Singles Chart at number 21. Metal Hammer magazine ranked the cover of "Planet Caravan" number 31 on their list of the 50 best Pantera songs.

Track listing 
American single

European single 1

European single 2

Charts

References 

Black Sabbath songs
1970 songs
Songs written by Geezer Butler
1994 singles
Songs written by Ozzy Osbourne
Songs written by Tony Iommi
Songs written by Bill Ward (musician)